The Birendra Museum is a museum located in Kathmandu Durbar Square, Kathmandu, Nepal. It is located alongside Tribhuvan Museum and Mahendra Museum. It contains personal artefacts that belonged to King Birendra Bir Bikram Shah, who is internationally known Nepalese king in the modern history.

References

See also 
 List of museums in Nepal

Museums in Kathmandu
Kathmandu Durbar Square